Kleo the Misfit Unicorn is Canadian children's animated series. A television pilot episode for the series aired in 1997, and Kleo the Misfit Unicorn became a regular series in 1998.

Plot
The series takes place in the fictional world of Misfit Land, populated by 'misfits', an eclectic group of characters notable for their unique traits that distinguish them from other members of their species. Kleo is a unicorn charged with aiding those who accidentally arrive in Misfit Land in returning to their home worlds.

Characters

Misfit Land (Ir)Regulars
These are the key misfits who have chosen to stay in Misfit Land indefinitely. They each represent a different aspect of what it can mean to be a misfit.

Kleopatra "Kleo" (The Misfit Unicorn)
The only winged unicorn in existence. She is the star of the show, sent from the unicorn home world of ZaZma on a special mission: to aid the departure of those who arrive in Misfit Land, but don't really belong there. She is the misfits' leader, and she becomes more assured in her role.

Slim (The Striped Hippo)
Slim talks pretty tough, with his gruff, Texan accent, but underneath the bluster, he's about as together as Yugoslavia. His inside often comes outside in moments of crisis. Nevertheless, no matter what his mood, he's always ready to help a friend, or a stranger, for that matter, and when it comes down to the crunch, his size and brute strength can come in handy.

Henry (The walking fish)
An upper-class English eccentric in the form of a fish that walks and lives in a tree. Henry considers misfitdom to be an exalted state, a cut above the common. In fact, he feels a snobbish, patrician pity for those poor souls who must "languish in conformity". Henry is supremely self-assured, and he (almost) always justifies that assurance, with grace and style to boot.

The Wannabee (The Shapeshifting Bee)
Convinced that "Nobody except beekeepers likes beez", The Bumbling Wannabee has, through the force of sheer insecurity, somehow achieved a chameleon-like ability to shape and voice-shift to whomever he's buzzing around at the time. Unfortunately, the impression is never perfect—no matter who he's imitating, he can't quite hide his wings, and his eyes alway stay a bit buggy. Also, whatever accent he puts on, there's a little bit of a buzz to it that he can't disguise. Things often go wrong around the Wannabee because he's too eager to please, and much too easily led, but no one ever doubts his good (though usually misguided) intentions.

Lyle (The unfierce Dragon)
Imagine the most horrifying reptilian monstrosity you've ever seen. Now imagine it wearing an apron and a friendly smile, offering you a fresh-made batch of chocolate chip cookies. Lyle is huge, with great, big, sharp teeth and impenetrable scales, but he's as unfierce as they come. He enjoys decorating his lair, and prefers to use his fiery breath for low-level convection, rather than crisping maidens, etc. Other dragons shun him for his friendly, tame ways, but that doesn't bother Lyle. He has plenty of friends in Misfit Land. He doesn't appear in every episode, just a few here and there.

Jazz Cat (The color changing Cat)
Jazz Cat plays cool smooth jazz as his colors change softly.

Unicorns

 Kleo's mother
 Kleo's father
 Justin (Strong)
 Tara (Swift)
 Macy (Skeptic)
 Felto (Teaser)
 Talbut - The bearded boss unicorn

Misfit Visitors

 George
 Marcus
 Emily
 Rosie
 Gong Li
 Thomas Edison
 Jenny
 William Shakespeare
 Sami the seal
 Sabrina the Snake
 Ena the Hyena
 Hilda the Raccoon
 Margery the Cheetah
 Jubilee Dancer the Racehorse
 Maggie the Magpie

Episode list

External links

Treehouse TV Kleo page (archived)

Treehouse TV original programming
Television about unicorns
Winged unicorns
Canadian children's animated fantasy television series
Fiction about planets
Television about magic
Television series about parallel universes
Canadian time travel television series
1990s Canadian time travel television series